The Marnes Rouges Inférieures Formation is a Late Cretaceous geologic formation found in the French Pyrenees. It predominantly consists of red mustone, with minor brown mudstone and sandstone. Dinosaurs, dinosaur eggs and avialian stem-birds have been reported from the formation.

Paleofauna 
 Allodaposuchus precedens
 Ampelosaurus atacis
 Foxemys mechinorum
 Gargantuavis philoinos
 Lirainosaurus astibiae
 Rhabdodon priscus

See also 
 List of dinosaur-bearing rock formations
 List of stratigraphic units with dinosaur trace fossils
 Dinosaur eggs

References

Bibliography 

  
  

Geologic formations of France
Upper Cretaceous Series of Europe
Cretaceous France
Maastrichtian Stage
Marl formations
Conglomerate formations
Sandstone formations
Fluvial deposits
Ooliferous formations
Paleontology in France